The Riley 12 was a medium-sized premium priced saloon or drophead coupé (also available as a bare chassis) which was available from mid 1939 though it was not announced by The Motor magazine as a new car until July 1939. Production ended in 1940 and the model was not revived after the war.

Bankruptcy
Directly after the bankruptcy of Riley, the company's assets came into the hands of the Nuffield Corporation which drastically pruned and rationalized the Riley model range, utilizing components from the MG/Morris/Wolseley parts bin.  This was one of three Riley models produced following that exercise until World War II put an end to Riley production, alongside the 16hp version with the same body and the 16hp Kestrel.

Design
Riley still retained a lot of autonomy after their acquisition by Lord Nuffield and this car was Riley's attempt to keep up with the fashions of the late thirties with helmet-style front mudguards and a bigger boot and slightly heavy styling. In many ways it was an update of the earlier 1936 Monaco and Adelphi models. The Adelphi in particular had been very successful for Riley and so it made sense to carry this theme forward with the new model. Underneath the new body the car was an updated Riley Victor chassis (basically a Merlin chassis) with some cost savings and also some improvements. With access to the Nuffield parts bin, Riley could adopt the MG/Wolseley synchro gearbox in place of the American Borg Warner overdrive box in place of the Riley sector box. The engine, though still with gear driven camshafts, had an improved water pump. Negatives were the adoption of an umbrella style handbrake under the dash.  Brake drums were smaller at 11 inches rather than the 13 inches of previous 12/4s. Springs now had rubber rather than bronze bushings.

The steering was by Bishop Cam, the column adjustable for length.  Springs were still semi-elliptic fore and aft. Brakes were still by the Girling rod system.

Road test
John Prioleau reviewed the car for The Observer. He described it as a compact car but not crowded, with plenty of room for four full-sized people. Front seats a little too upright. Nicest looking dashboard on any 1939 car. This saloon is not fast but it can cruise within 5 mph of its maximum (he reached an indicated 67 mph). The steering was light and responsive.

References

External links
 Sales brochure
 Advertisement The Autocar June 1939

12
1940s cars
Rear-wheel-drive vehicles
Executive cars
Sedans
Convertibles
Cars introduced in 1939